Manuela Pinto Vieira d'Ávila (born 18 August 1981) is a Brazilian journalist, writer and politician, a member of the Communist Party of Brazil since 2001.

She served as a federal deputy for Rio Grande do Sul between 2007 and 2015, being the leader of her party in the Chamber of Deputies in 2013. She also served as a state deputy for her state between 2015 and 2019 and as a councilwoman for the state capital Porto Alegre between 2005 and 2007.

She was Fernando Haddad's vice presidential running mate in the Worker's Party presidential bid in the 2018 general election; the Haddad-d'Ávila ticket lost to Jair Bolsonaro in the second round of the presidential campaign.

Biography

Born in Porto Alegre, D'Ávila started her political career in the student movement and eventually joined the PCdoB. She was the youngest city councilor in the history of Porto Alegre, being elected in 2004 at the age of 23. She was elected federal deputy in 2006 and was reelected in 2010. On both occasions, she was the single candidate with the most votes received in her state.

D'Ávila ran for mayor in her state's capital three times. In the first run, in 2008, she finished 3rd place. In her second run, in 2012, she placed 2nd, being defeated in the first round by José Fortunati of the Democratic Labor Party. In February 2020, d'Ávila publicly announced her intent to run for mayor of Porto Alegre for the PCdoB in the 2020 Brazilian municipal elections. In May, the Workers' Party officially endorsed her candidacy by nominating Miguel Rossetto as her running mate. She lost in the second round to Sebastião Melo of the Brazilian Democratic Movement.

In 2014, she was elected state deputy with the highest number of votes for that office in that year.

During the PCdoB Congress in November 2017, Manuela was launched as pre-candidate for President of Brazil in the 2018 election. However, she later abandoned her campaign in favor of supporting the candidacy of Luiz Inácio Lula da Silva. On 11 September 2018, D'Ávila became the running mate of Fernando Haddad, who replaced Lula as candidate after he was barred from running by the Superior Electoral Court. Despite coming in second place in the first round of voting and proceeding to the second round, Haddad and d'Ávila lost the race to far-right candidate Jair Bolsonaro (PSL) and his running mate Hamilton Mourão (PRTB).

In 2019, she published her first book Revolução Laura: reflexões sobre maternidade e resistência. The book is a personal account of d'Ávila's own experience with maternity after the birth of Laura, her daughter. It addresses issues such as feminism and political activism in the context of motherhood and the challenges of raising a child as a politician and as a presidential candidate. Her second book Por que lutamos? was published in the same year, followed by her third book E se fosse você, published in 2020.

She declined to run for office in the 2022 Brazilian general election despite speculation that she would mount a bid for Federal Senate to represent Rio Grande do Sul.

Personal life
She is married to musician Duca Leindecker.  Her first daughter, Laura, was born on 27 August 2015.

Between February 2008 and January 2010, she dated then federal deputy and former Minister of Justice José Eduardo Cardozo. In June 2012, during an interview in the Brazilian late night show Agora É Tarde, she stated that the decision to admit to the relationship with the former deputy was "the bravest decision she has ever made in her life as a Congresswoman."

In the media, D'Ávila has often been referred to as the "muse of Congress" in reference to her perceived physical beauty. She finds the term offensive and in 2014, she declared: "Everyone likes to receive compliments when they are in a space [where it is acceptable] to be complimented. [...] But I wasn't running for Miss Brazil. I ran for an election and I want to be rated by my work. And men have never been distinguished [solely] by their looks and women have. It doesn't bother me individually, but it bothers me as a woman who fights for women to be respected".

After saying that religion should not be taught in public schools, D'Ávila was accused by some of her political opponents of being an atheist. D'Ávila claims to be a Christian.

Controversies
In a 2017 Operation Car Wash statement, former Odebrecht CEO Alexandrino Alencar accused d'Ávila of illicitly receiving R$360.000,00 (US$100,000) for her electoral campaigns. Despite his claim, no further evidence was presented. She denies any wrongdoing.

The biggest implicated company, Odebrecht kept an entire department to coordinate the payment of bribe to politicians. In the Car Wash Operation, officers seized several electronic spreadsheets linking the payments to nicknames. Every corrupt politician received a nickname based on physical characteristics, public trajectory, personal infos, owned cars/boats, origin place or generic preferences. According to the claim, d'Ávila's nickname was 'Avião', "aircraft" in Portuguese, which is also a Brazilian slang to call a woman "hot".

See also
 History of the socialist movement in Brazil
 2018 Brazilian general election

References

1981 births
Living people
People from Porto Alegre
Brazilian women in politics
Pontifical Catholic University of Rio Grande do Sul alumni
Members of the Chamber of Deputies (Brazil) from Rio Grande do Sul
Members of the Legislative Assembly of Rio Grande do Sul
Communist Party of Brazil politicians
Brazilian feminists
Brazilian communists
Brazilian Christians
Christian communists
Candidates for Vice President of Brazil